Engraved on a Nation is a Canadian sports documentary anthology series commissioned by TSN.

The series originally premiered in 2012, with an anthology of 8 documentaries surrounding the Canadian Football League and the Grey Cup, in honour of its centennial edition. In 2019, TSN revived the series with a new season of 6 documentaries beginning February 6, 2019, now focusing on notable figures and stories in all of Canadian sport.

Episodes

Season 1

Season 2

See also 
 30 for 30, a similar series of sports documentaries produced by TSN's minority partner ESPN.

References

Sources
 Boone, Mike (2 June 2012). "Film offers unique perspective; Trudeau helped kick off 1969 Grey Cup game during the middle of Quebec's FLQ Crisis". Montreal Gazette.
 Edmonds, Scott (27 June 2012). "Tube stakes are higher in 100th Grey Cup year." Hamilton Spectator.
 Jones, Terry (16 August 2012). "Capturing the magic; Eskimos Western Swagger documentary part of eight-part CFL series that celebrates the 100th Grey Cup". Edmonton Sun.
 Lees, Nick (18 July 2012). "We all scream for ice cream". Edmonton Journal.
 MacKinnon, John. "Proud to be a team player". Edmonton Journal.
 Mitchell, Bob (8 May 2012). "Engraved on a Nation; A new series of docs celebrates the rich, 100-year history of the Grey Cup and its place in our national heritage". Toronto Star
 Mitchell, Bob (7 July 2012). "Ex-Argo Theisman still sore about '71". Toronto Star.
 Mitchell, Bob (8 July 2012). "The wrong turn that won't go away". Toronto Star.
 Mitchell, Bob (22 August 2012). "Stampeder's hike honours grandfather". Toronto Star.
 Odland, Kristen (27 September 2012). "Patience close to paying off for offensive lineman Harrison". Calgary Herald.
 Ralph, Dan (5 May 2012). "CFL will go deep with Grey Cup documentaries".Hamilton Spectator.
 Stinson, Scott (5 May 2012). "TSN, CFL hope project lights a torch".National Post.
 Vanstone, Rob (4 May 2012). "TSN unveils plans for CFL documentaries". Regina Leader-Post.

2012 Canadian television series debuts
The Sports Network original programming
2010s Canadian documentary television series
2010s Canadian sports television series